Aldan may refer to:

People
Gille Aldan, the first bishop of Galloway, Scotland
Andrey Aldan-Semenov (1908–1985), Russian writer
Duke Aldan, a fictional character in Langrisser IV video game

Places
Aldan, Russia, a town in the Sakha Republic, Russia
Aldan Urban Settlement, a municipal formation which incorporates the town of Aldan and two rural localities in Aldansky District of the Sakha Republic, Russia
Aldan, Pennsylvania, a borough in Pennsylvania, United States
Aldan Highlands in the Sakha Republic, Russia
Aldan (river), a river in the Sakha Republic, Russia
Aldan Shield, a geological region in Siberia, Russia
Aldan Airport, an airport in the Sakha Republic, Russia
Aldan mine, an iron mine in the Sakha Republic, Russia

Other
Aldan, computer in the science fiction fantasy novel "Monday Begins on Saturday" by Strugatsky brothers

See also
Alden (disambiguation)
Clifton–Aldan (SEPTA station), a SEPTA station in Clifton Heights, Pennsylvania, United States
Aldansky District, a district of the Sakha Republic, Russia